Francis Marion Burdick LL.D. (1845–1920) was an American legal scholar.

Biography
Francis Marion Burdick was born at De Ruyter, New York on August 1, 1845.

He graduated at Hamilton College in 1869, and in 1872 from the law department at that institution. He practiced law until 1883.  He was mayor of Utica, N. Y. in 1882 and 1883.
Afterwards, he held positions in Hamilton College, Cornell University, and Columbia University, and was a commissioner for the State of New York.  He was the first Theodore Dwight Professor of Law at Columbia Law School.

He married Sarah Underhill on June 8, 1875 and they had four children.

Francis Marion Burdick died at his home in De Ruyter on June 3, 1920.

Works
Besides contributing extensively to legal periodicals he published:  
 Cases on Torts (1895)  
 The Law of Sales (third edition, 1913)  
 Cases on Sales (second edition, 1901)  
 The Law of Torts (1905, second  edition, 1908)  
 Law of Partnership (second edition, 1906)  
 The Essentials of Business Law (1908)

References

American legal writers
1845 births
1920 deaths
Columbia Law School faculty
Cornell University faculty
Hamilton College (New York) alumni
Hamilton College (New York) faculty
Mayors of Utica, New York